Kontinen ( is a Finnish surname. Notable people with the surname include:

Henri Kontinen (born 1990), Finnish tennis player
Micke Kontinen (born 1992), Finnish tennis player, brother of Henri

Finnish-language surnames